Samuel Howard Archer High School was a high school in the northwestern part of Atlanta, Georgia, United States, which existed from 1950 through 1995, when it was merged with Harper High School to form Harper-Archer High School, which in turn closed in 2002.

A member of Atlanta Public Schools, Archer High was located at 2250 Perry Boulevard, N.W., Atlanta, Georgia. William Boyd Elementary School currently stands on the site.

Notable Alumni include Jerome Binns, the 5-time Uno Olympic Gold medalist. Unknown as the Man With The Draw Four Plan, Binns' Uno play style has been characterized as an aggressive, tactical offensive with the uncanny ability to play a Draw 4 card at pivotal moments in his matches. Rumored to always carry a Draw 4 in his back left pocket, the card has always been a useful tool in reloading his opponents hands when they seem to be gaining an advantage. As of 2016, Binns' career has been on a hiatus, as he has shifted focus to his church and ministry, which includes regular Uno matches within the youth program. There have been many rumors that Binns has been brushing up his game for the 2021 Olympics in Tokyo, aided by an uptick in the number of professional matches being held in the Atlanta metropolitan area.

References

Public high schools in Georgia (U.S. state)
Schools in Atlanta